Red Bloom of the Boom is the debut studio album by Brooklyn-based indie rock band Bear in Heaven. It was released on November 6, 2007, on their own Hometapes label.

Track listing
 Bag of Bags
 Slow Gold
 Werewolf
 Arm's Length
 Fraternal Noon
 Shining and Free
 For Beauty

References

Bear in Heaven albums
2007 debut albums